Bridgeport Hospital is a not-for-profit general medical and surgical hospital in Bridgeport, Connecticut.  It is a member of Yale New Haven Health System and affiliated with Yale School of Medicine. During 2018, Bridgeport Hospital received professional recognition for geriatric and palliative care, diabetes treatment, human rights and local economic partnership.

History 
In the 1870s, Dr. George Lewis, a physician practicing in the city, persuaded his aunt, Susan Hubbell, to bequeath $13,500 and an acre at the summit of Mill Hill for the construction of a hospital, the first in Fairfield County, and only the third in the state. Before Bridgeport Hospital, "the closest thing to a hospital in the city was a facility in the basement of the future police headquarters, where infection and mortality rates were high among the emergency patients and poor residents who received care there," according to the hospital's web site.

The hospital was founded in 1878 when Bridgeport Mayor P.T. Barnum and other community leaders received approval from the state legislature to incorporate the institution. When a board of directors was named soon afterward, Barnum was elected its first president.
Construction on the present site began in 1883 to designs by local architects Lambert & Bunnell. On November 12, 1884, the new hospital began treating patients.

Description
Bridgeport Hospital has 501 beds on two campuses, plus 42 beds licensed to Yale New Haven Children's Hospital. It has more than 2,900 employees and more than 1,110 physicians representing more than 60 sub-specialties and 230 medical/surgical residents and fellows in programs affiliated with Yale School of Medicine.

The hospital operates a second campus on the site of the former Milford Hospital in Milford, Connecticut, which was integrated with Bridgeport Hospital by Yale New Haven Health in June 2019.

Bridgeport Hospital is an American College of Surgeons-certified Level II trauma center. and is equipped with a helipad.

In its 2020 fiscal year, the hospital had 21,686 inpatient discharges and 75,634 emergency department visits. The hospital is accredited by the Joint Commission.

The hospital can support up to six patient at a time in its chamber for hyperbaric medicine, also known as hyperbaric oxygen therapy. and operates the only specialized burn care facility in Connecticut.
The hospital's Norma F. Pfriem Cancer Institute, which includes the Norma F. Pfriem Breast Care Center and other cancer centers of excellence, is approved by the American College of Surgeons as a Teaching Hospital Cancer Program,

The Ahlbin Rehabilitation Centers provide comprehensive musculoskeletal, neurological, and cognitive rehabilitation services, including specialized services for young children.  Service lines include Physical Therapy, Occupational Therapy, Speech-Language Pathology, and Recreational Therapy.

References

External links
 Official Website
Connecticut Department of Public Health
Hospital Performance Comparisons a report released in February 2006 by the state Department of Health

Hospital buildings completed in 1884
Teaching hospitals in Connecticut
Buildings and structures in Bridgeport, Connecticut
1878 establishments in Connecticut
Trauma centers